The Scottish Rite Temple, also known as Scottish Rite Cathedral or Santa Fe Lodge of Perfection, in Santa Fe, New Mexico was begun in 1911 and completed in 1912.  It was a filming location for the 2016 Tina Fey film Whiskey Tango Foxtrot.

In 1909 Santa Fe's paper, The Daily New Mexican, announced that local (he lived and had offices in both New Mexico and Colorado) architect Isaac H. Rapp had been awarded the commission to design a new  Scottish Rite Cathedral.  A few months later, in July of the same year, it printed a perspective by Rapp showing a grand Neo-classical styled design for the Temple.  Only a week later the same paper printed that Rapp's plans had been considered to be "not satisfactory".

Shortly afterwards it was announced that the Los Angeles architectural firm of Hunt and Burns had been employed instead.  They produced a Moorish Revival style structure based loosely on one of the gatehouses to the Court of the Lions at the Alhambra in Spain.  Sumner P. Hunt and Silas Reese Burns were well known for their designs in the California Spanish Mission Revival architecture style, but decided instead to base their design on a connection between the Spanish building tradition of New Mexico and that of the Moors in southern Spain.  There are also obvious similarities with the Southwest Museum, in Los Angeles, which was being designed by Hunt and Burns around the same time, including the tower, without the Islamic entry. 

Still somewhat shocking today is that the building was, and still is (as of 2014) clad in pink colored stucco.

That Isaac Rapp did not get the commission was not a huge loss to him as he was to build his design in 1913 as the Las Animas County Court House, in Trinidad, Colorado.  Also, that he did not design the building that was ultimately built was apparently missed by some, as he has been erroneously listed as the architect of the building.

It was used historically as a clubhouse.  The building was listed on the National Register of Historic Places in 1987.

See also

National Register of Historic Places listings in Santa Fe County, New Mexico

References

Masonic buildings in New Mexico
Masonic buildings completed in 1911
Scottish Rite Temple
Clubhouses on the National Register of Historic Places in New Mexico
1910s architecture in the United States
Sumner Hunt buildings
Moorish Revival architecture in New Mexico
National Register of Historic Places in Santa Fe, New Mexico